The men's dual moguls competition of the FIS Freestyle Ski and Snowboarding World Championships 2017 was held at Sierra Nevada, Spain on March 9 (qualifying and finals).
51 athletes from 18 countries competed.

Qualification
The following are the results of the qualification.

Top Half

Bottom Half

Final
The following are the results of the finals.

References

dual moguls, men's